Tunisian–Turkish relations are foreign relations between Tunisia and Turkey. Tunisia has an embassy in Ankara and a consulate-general in Istanbul. Turkey has an embassy in Tunis. The diplomatic relations between Turkey and Tunisia were established in 1956 just after Tunisia gained its independence. Both countries are full members of the Union for the Mediterranean. The countries have had strong ethnic and cultural ties since the Ottoman colonization of Tunisia starting in the early 16th century. Due to several centuries of at least nominal Ottoman control of Tunisia, as much as 25% of Tunisians are at least partially of creole Turkish descent. Both countries signed The Treaty of Friendship and Cooperation on 15 September 2011. Turkey helped Tunisia after the Jasmine Revolution with financial and technical aid. Tunisia and Turkey have good economic ties. Many Tunisian merchants buy clothing (mostly) and other goods from Turkey. Also, Turkey is a very popular tourist destination for Tunisians. Citizens of both countries can travel visa-free between each other. Turkey and Tunisia are allies under the Major non-NATO ally agreement.

On 25 December 2012, a joint declaration on the establishment High Level Strategic Cooperation Council (HLSCC) between Turkey and Tunisia was signed in Ankara by Prime Ministers of both countries. With this political declaration, the two countries laid the legal foundation for a closer bilateral cooperation mechanism and agreed to cooperate in the fields of politics, security, military, economy, science, technology and trade.

See also

Turks in Tunisia
Foreign relations of Tunisia
Foreign relations of Turkey

References

External links
Tunisian embassies in Turkey
Turkish Ministry of Foreign Affairs about the relations with Tunisia

 
Turkey
Bilateral relations of Turkey